Montego Bay is the capital of the parish of St. James in Jamaica. The city is the fourth-largest urban area in the country by population, after Kingston, Spanish Town, and Portmore, all of which form the Greater Kingston Metropolitan Area, home to over half a million people. As a result, Montego Bay is the second-largest anglophone city in the Caribbean, after Kingston.

Montego Bay is a popular tourist destination featuring duty-free shopping, a cruise line terminal and several beaches and resorts. The city is served by the Donald Sangster International Airport, the busiest airport in the Anglophone Caribbean, which is located within the official city limits. The city is enclosed in a watershed, drained by several rivers such as the Montego River. Montego Bay is referred to as "The Second City", "MoBay" or "Bay".

History

The Arawak tribe of South America are Jamaica's first known inhabitants and were there to greet Christopher Columbus when he ventured to the island in 1494. Columbus named the bay of Montego, Golfo de Buen Tiempo ("Fair Weather Gulf"). The name "Montego Bay" is believed to have originated as a corruption of the Spanish word manteca ("lard"), allegedly because during the Spanish period it was the port where lard, leather and beef were exported. Jamaica was a colony of Spain from 1511 until 1655, when Oliver Cromwell's Caribbean expedition, the Western Design, drove the Spanish from the island. After the British removed the Spanish rule, along with the majority of all buildings and infrastructure, the colonials established the Parish of St. James which directly influenced the area in becoming a huge contributor of sugar cane. In fact, during this period of British governing, Montego Bay was the largest producer of sugar cane on the island of Jamaica, giving the region more value than originally anticipated.

Throughout the duration of slavery, from the mid-17th century until 1834, and well into the 20th century, the town of Montego Bay functioned primarily as a sugarcane port. The island's last major slave revolt, the Christmas Rebellion or Baptist War (1831–1832) took place in and around the area of Montego Bay. The rebellion set estates and plantations to flame and was the start of a broader political push toward emancipation. Retribution was quickly sought by British leaders and many were hanged for their attempts at revolt; the leader of the revolt, Samuel Sharpe, was hanged there in 1832. Recognition was later given, and Sharpe was proclaimed a national hero of Jamaica in 1975, and the main square of the town was renamed in his honor. Eventually, Jamaica was emancipated on August 1, 1834 which granted all new children born or children under the age of six "free," but held individuals outside of that parameter to be apprentices and work forty hours a week in compensation to their previous or original owners. It was not until four years after these restrictions were put in place that all slave and apprentices were given the status of full freedom. After the half decade emancipation process, Montego Bay and its sugar cane industry took a hit. Therefore, it branched out and took root in expanding into exporting bananas and coffee as well.

Montego Bay's city status prior to British rule was debated; however, it had its city status revoked during Jamaica's British colonial period. It was re-proclaimed a city by act of parliament in 1980, but this has not meant that it has acquired any form of autonomy, for it continues to be an integral part of the parish of St. James.

Today, Montego Bay is known for Cornwall Regional Hospital, port facilities, second homes for numerous upper-class Jamaicans from Kingston as well as North Americans and Europeans, fine restaurants, and shopping. The coastland near Montego Bay is occupied by numerous tourist resorts, most newly built, some occupying the grounds of old sugarcane plantations with some of the original buildings and mill-works still standing. The most famous is the White Witch's Rose Hall which features a world-class golf course.

The infrastructure of the city is going through a series of modernizations which once completed, aims to keep Montego Bay as a top destination in the region. The Montego Bay Convention Centre, built on a large site near to the Rose Hall estate, was opened by Jamaican Prime Minister Bruce Golding on 7 January 2011.

Demographics
The majority of the city's population is of African descent. The city is also home to sizeable minority ethnic groups such as the East Indians and Chinese, who came to the country as indentured servants in the mid-to-late 19th century. The Chinese especially occupy important roles in the city's economy especially in retail where Downtown Montego Bay is home to many shops and supermarkets owned by Chinese immigrants. The city's East Indian population also play a key role as they operate many gift and jewelry shops in the city which are mostly geared to tourists.

There is a minority of Europeans, some descending from immigrants from Germany (the city is a 90-minute drive from German settlements such as German Town in Westmoreland) and Great Britain (who own most of the land in the city from as far back as the days of the slave trade).

The city is home to many immigrants from Hispanic countries such as Mexico, Cuba and Spain as well as many French, Russians and Italians (who mostly own homes or beachfront properties in the area).

The city is home to many Americans and Canadians, who work the tourism or business process outsourcing (BPO) industries.

Religion
There are a wide variety of Christian churches in the city. Most are Protestant, a legacy of British colonisation of the island. The chief denominations are Church of God, Baptist, Anglican, Methodist, Roman Catholic, Seventh-day Adventist and Pentecostal. Afro-Christian syncretic religions such as the Rastafari movement also have a significant following. The city also has a unit of the Church of Jesus Christ of Latter-day Saints.

The city also has communities of Buddhists, Hindus, and Muslims.

Economy

Montego Bay is pivotal to Jamaica's economy. The city holds most of the weight of the country's tourism sector. Most of the country's visitors arrive and depart from Montego Bay's airport or port. Many international companies have resorts in the city including Hyatt, Hilton Hotels, Holiday Inn, RIU Hotels, Royalton and Iberostar. The city is the home to the headquarters of international resort chain Sandals. The Government of Jamaica, through the Ministry of Tourism, has begun to focus on bolstering the city's entertainment and gastronomic offerings. Though the city's airport hosts a number international chains, the city itself does not have access to these restaurants. By virtue of this new focus, the city has become home to a newly established Hard Rock Café and became home to Starbucks' first Jamaican location, at Doctor's Cave Beach, in November 2017. The city also serves as the Head Office for Starbucks' operations in Jamaica.

The city is also home to a thriving Business Process Outsourcing (BPO) sector. The city has call centres which cater to many Fortune 500 companies such as Delta,  Netflix and many others. In addition, Vistaprint established its only call centre in Montego Bay which located in the city's up and coming tech park. Most of the city's business is done in the downtown area, however, as of recent, the CBD has begun to migrate to the suburb of Fairview/Bogue which is home to the Fairview Town Centre, which is a five-minute commute from Montego Freezone, the city's dedicated area to BPO activity. The area is mostly populated with retail and banking, most notable are Scotiabank's new Fairview branch, The G-West building, Flow's first and flagship store in the Caribbean redesigned by retail experts, Shikatani Lacroix, and Fontana Pharmacy's flagship store. The town centre is also important to the city as it hosts places such as Digicel's Corporate offices for Western Jamaica as well as many auditing, law and insurance firms.

Institutions

The city hosts many financial institutions such as Scotiabank, FCIB, National Commercial Bank, Jamaica National Commercial Bank (JN Bank) and many others. The city also has offices for many auditing firms such as KPMG and PwC.

The city is home to many health institutions such as the Cornwall Regional Hospital as well as the recently opened, Hospiten, a Spanish-owned, private hospital located in Rose Hall.

Education in the city can be found from Pre-K up to Tertiary. The city has many Pre-K and Basic Schools. Beyond this, the city has many Primary and Preparatory Schools. Secondary Education is also provided in the city most notable of which are the Montego Bay High School for Girls, Mount Alvernia High School—a Roman Catholic High School for Girls which shares the same crest, motto and wears a uniform similar to that of sister school of Immaculate Conception High School in Kingston, Herbert Morrison Technical High School and the oldest school in the city, Cornwall College, an all-boys' school.

Tertiary Institutions in the city are namely the University of West Indies (UWI) – Western Jamaica Campus, The University of Technology (UTECH) Montego Bay Campus, Sam Sharpe Teachers' College (SSTC) and the Montego Bay Community College (MBCC). Most tertiary institutions in the city are accredited.

Transport

Roads
The North Coast Highway runs through the city of Montego Bay, with 2 lanes in each direction within the city, terminating at the Queen's Drive and resuming at the intersection of the Alice Eldemire Drive and Barnett Street. The North Coast Highway connects Montego Bay with the North-South section of Highway 2000 (called T3), which begins at Mammee Bay in Ocho Rios, St. Ann and terminates at an interchange which leads onto the Mandela Highway in St. Catherine and into the nation's capital, Kingston.

Another major road within the city is the B15 (Montego Bay to Falmouth) road. The city is also well served by buses, mini-busses and taxis, which operate from the Montego Bay Transport Centre.

The Government of Jamaica announced that a tolled bypass to the city has been planned to be built in order to reduce traffic congestion and travel times. The bypass is to begin at Westgate and end at Ironshore. The bypass is expected to cost around USD $200 Million.

Rail
The now disused Montego Bay railway station served the Kingston to Montego Bay main line. The railway station opened c. 1894, and closed in October 1992 when all passenger traffic on Jamaica's railways abruptly ceased.

Air
Montego Bay is served by Jamaica's largest airport, the Sangster International Airport. The airport has the distinction of being the busiest airport in the English-speaking Caribbean, serving 4.3 million passengers in 2017.

The airport was the hub of Jamaica's former national airline Air Jamaica. The airline also had its reservations, Western Jamaica sales & ticketing office, as well as its vacations division in the city until its purchase by Caribbean Airlines in 2011, when they moved their offices to Kingston. The site is now the headquarters for Island Routes, a company owned by the Sandals-ATL Group, which in the past was affiliated with the airline.

The airport is served by several North American and European airlines, connecting the island with the United States, the United Kingdom, Europe and South America. The southern U.S. city of Miami can be reached within 70 minutes. The southern U.S. cities of Charlotte, Houston, Atlanta and Tampa can be reached by non-stop flights in less than three hours. Other locations like Philadelphia, New York City, Toronto, Washington D.C. and Montreal can be reached in under four hours. The airport is also one of two airports in the Caribbean (other being Havana), that has a non-stop flight to Los Angeles, allowing passengers the ability to connect to flights to Asia, Australia and Oceania. The airport has undergone major expansion since 2003, and has won awards including the coveted World Travel Award for being the Caribbean's Leading Airport, beating airports like Punta Cana International Airport and Grantley Adams International Airport.

Port
There is a free port and cruise line terminal on a man-made peninsula jutting into the bay.

Communications

Fixed voice and broadband
Fixed voice and broadband services in Montego Bay is provided by FLOW. FLOW uses a Hybrid Fibre and Coaxial network to provide IPTV, VoIP & POTS and cable broadband capable of speeds up to 100 Mbit/s. FLOW also uses a Copper network to provide POTS and ADSL capable of speeds up to 12 Mbit/s. This copper network is currently being upgraded to VDSL2, which may allow speeds of over 50 Mbit/s over existing copper lines as well as provide a migration path for the provider to Fibre to the Home. FLOW also has a fibre-optic network in the neighbourhood of Rhyne Park which provides up to 100 Mbit/s as well. There are several other small cable companies such as Cornwall Communications, that provides cable broadband and voice over its cable network; however, they are vastly incomparable in subscriber numbers to FLOW.

Mobile voice and broadband
Mobile voice and broadband services in Montego Bay is dominated by both incumbents, FLOW & Digicel. Both carriers provide GSM, EDGE, 3G HSPA & HSPA+ connectivity in and around the city.

Currently, FLOW offers HSPA+ of up to 21 Mbit/s on 850 MHz and 1900 MHz with speeds of up to 21 Mbit/s. FLOW also offers LTE data in Montego Bay. The company is the currently the only carrier to provide comprehensive LTE coverage within the city itself. Coverage also extends out towards to the adjoining rural areas surrounding Montego Bay such as Liliput to east and Hopewell (in the parish of Hanover) to the west.  FLOW's LTE network uses LTE Band 4, commonly known as AWS. Users can avail themselves of speeds of up to 150 Mbit/s down and 50 Mbit/s up. In some areas in the city, FLOW subscribers are able to access LTE Advanced with speeds up to 225 Mbit/s; making Montego Bay the only city in Jamaica to have access to such.

Digicel, Jamaica's larger mobile network, also offers 21 Mbit/s HSPA+; however, they also offer DC-HSDPA (commonly known as DC-HSPA+) allowing capable devices speeds of up to 42 Mbit/s on paired 850 MHz spectrum. Digicel's LTE network is also available in Montego Bay, owing to its commitment to provide an islandwide LTE network, offering LTE in the city for its subscribers. The network is theoretically capable of speeds up to 75 Mbit/s on 10 MHz of Band 17 spectrum.

In popular culture
The city was the subject of a namesake song by Bobby Bloom in 1970, which became a Top Ten hit in the United States for Bloom. It was covered by Jon Stevens in 1980 and by Amazulu in 1986, becoming minor hits for both.

Several scenes from the 1973 James Bond film Live and Let Die (in which Roger Moore appeared as Bond for the first time) were filmed around Montego Bay.

Climate
Montego Bay has a tropical monsoon climate (Köppen climate classification Am), with a wet season and a drier season and the temperature being warm or hot year-round. The hottest time of year is from June to September.

Montego Bay receives  of rain over 127 precipitation days, with wetter and drier months. The dry season is fairly short, lasting from January to April. July also sees a dip in precipitation. October, the wettest month, receives  of rainfall over 14 precipitation days on average. Humidity remains consistently high year-round. Montego Bay receives 2788 hours of sunshine annually (7.6 hours per day) on average, with the sunshine being distributed fairly evenly across the year.

Notable people
 Corey Ballentine, football cornerback and kick returner for the Atlanta Falcons
 Steve Bucknor, Test cricket umpire
 Violet Brown, Jamaican supercentenarian
 Ian Goodison, Jamaican footballer
 Richard Hart, Jamaican politician
 Richard Hill, lawyer and abolitionist
 Donovan Ricketts, Jamaican footballer
 Musashi Suzuki, Japanese footballer
 Ruby Turner, singer and actress
 Nicholas Walters, professional boxer

See also

 List of cities in the Caribbean
 Railway stations in Jamaica

References

External links

 Aerial view

 
1980 establishments in Jamaica
Populated places established in the 16th century
Populated coastal places in Jamaica
Populated places in Saint James Parish, Jamaica
Port cities in the Caribbean
Year of establishment missing